William Clarke was the seventeenth Mayor of Jersey City, New Jersey. He succeeded Charles H. O'Neill. Clarke served from April, 1869 to May 1, 1870. He was succeeded by Charles H. O'Neill.

External links
Jersey City Mayors

Mayors of Jersey City, New Jersey
19th-century American politicians
Year of birth missing
Year of death missing